Port Foster is one of the safest harbours in Antarctica, located in Deception Island in the South Shetland Islands.

History
The harbour was known to sealers as early as 1820, and in its early history was called Port Williams, after Captain William Smith's brig, Williams; or Yankee Harbor, because of the number of American sealers who harboured there.

The expedition, based in Pendulum Cove, made gravitational and magnetic measurements, produced the first topographic map, made temperature measurements, and made a hydrographic survey.

Former names for the port have remained for other features in the same archipelago — Williams Point and Yankee Harbor.

Description

The centre of Deception Island is a caldera, formed by a gigantic volcanic eruption and later flooded. This has created the  basin-like harbour of Port Foster.

The benthic zone of Port Foster is of great ecological interest due to the natural disturbance induced by the volcanic activity. Two areas have been collectively protected as Antarctic Specially Protected Area (ASPA) No.145.

See also
Stancomb Cove
Stanley Patch
Wensleydale Beacon

References

Geography of Deception Island
Antarctic Specially Protected Areas
Bodies of water of the South Shetland Islands
Ports and harbours of the South Shetland Islands